Phone Swap is a 2012 Nigerian romance comedy-drama film written by Kemi Adesoye, directed and produced by Kunle Afolayan. It stars Nse Ikpe Etim, Wale Ojo, Joke Silva, Chika Okpala, Lydia Forson and Afeez Oyetoro. The film was conceived after a brief from an advertising agency to create a movie that would cut across ages 15 to 45.

It narrates the story of Mary, a warm-hearted fashion designer who works under a very stringent boss, and Akin, an arrogant, withdrawn and bossy business executive. They accidentally swap their mobile phones at a busy airport, which leads to an exchange in their destinations and the need to help carryout each other's assignments.

Phone Swap was shot in Lagos and made in partnership with Globacom and BlackBerry. It also got financial support from Meelk Properties, IRS Airlines, Seven-up Bottling Company, Honeywell Flour Mill and several others. The scripting stage for the film took two years, while the production and post production stages took six weeks and three months respectively. The film received critical acclaim and was highly successful at the box office. It received 4 nominations at the 8th Africa Movie Academy Awards which includes the category Best Nigerian Film and won the award Achievement in Production Design.

Plot
Mary (Nse Ikpe Etim) is a fashion designer who works for a stringent boss, Alexis, who often takes credit for her designs. Mary is called on the phone by her father in the village about a marital problem involving her sister and her husband. Mary must return to the village as the family will discuss the problem and it is only Mary to which her sister listens. Alexis will not give Mary permission to leave work although Mary insists that she can complete the clothing while away. Alexis is not persuaded. Mary finds out that her boyfriend is married and she breaks up with him. Alexis takes pity on Mary and allows her to take time off from work in order to sort out her problems. Alexis books a flight ticket for Mary so that the dust and dirt of regular ground travel will not mar the clothing that Mary is given permission to take with her while away during that busy time of work.

Akin (Wale Ojo) is always at loggerhead with colleagues at his work, he does not get along with his mother and his girlfriend. His boss is concerned about his recent behaviour, as a result shuts him out of knowing the venue of a company retreat, as many believe he is about to expose the misdeeds of his colleagues so that he can get the position of the C.E.O. Akin instructs his Assistant, Alex (Hafeez Oyetoro) to find out the venue for the retreat by any means. Akin arrives home one day and sees his girlfriend, Gina (Lydia Forson) drunk and she has also rearranged the living room. Akin gets upset and asks for his house keys. Gina gets angry, gives him the keys and leaves the house cussing him.

Akin heads to the airport and books a flight ticket to Abuja. Mary is also at the airport and bumps into Akin in her rush. Afterwards, a message enters into the phone Akin is holding with the name 'Alex' saying "Enjoy your Flight to Owerri". Thinking the message was his assistant, he quickly goes to book a ticket to Owerri. Mary, in her naivety queues on the counter issuing tickets to Abuja and pays for the ticket. In the Airplane, Akin notices a change in the ringing tone of the phone in his pocket and realizes the phone is not his. He notifies the flight attendant, but it is already too late. Mary asks the flight attendant the duration of her flight to Owerri and she is told the flight is flying to Abuja and not Owerri.

Akin arrives in Owerri and asks for the ticket to Abuja, but he is told there's no flight scheduled for Abuja for the rest of the day. Mary also arrives in Abuja and calls her number through the phone in her hand. She tells Akin she is in Abuja and they both decide to find a way out. Akin asks Mary to go to his mother's house in Abuja, Akin also finds himself in Mary's Father's house which is a very ancient house. Mary's sister, Cynthia (Ada Ameh) introduces Akin to their father (Chika Okpala) as Mary's boyfriend. Mary is also received happily by Akin's mother, Kike (Joke Silva) and she believed Mary is Akin's girlfriend. Mary tries to explain to her what happened, but she is too overjoyed to listen. Akin finds it hard to adapt to the life in the Village: He asks the family for a cutlery to eat 'swallow' food and he is laughed at, He is also unable to sleep with the others on bed and goes to sleep on the veranda. He finds it hard to sleep on the Veranda again due to mosquitoes. He gets up and calls Mary instead and they get to discuss many things like the fact that her sister's sin is that she beats her husband and she's accused of pulling her husband's penis this time around. Mary asks Akin to speak to Cynthia on her behalf because she thinks Cynthia will listen to him as Cynthia seems to like him. Akin also asks Mary to go to the company's retreat on his behalf. He tells her that all she needs to do is give the chairman the information on the memory card of his phone. Akin talks to Cynthia and she accepts to behave responsibly at the family meeting and to start behaving responsibly at home in order to preserve the future of her kids. At the meeting she kneels down for the Elders and apologizes to everyone in a sober state and eventually bursts into tears.

Mary gets ready for a party organized by Kike and it appears she has nothing to wear, so she decided to sew the cloth Alexis gave her to work on. Unfortunately, she meets the owner of the dress at the party; in her anxiety to escape, she falls into the swimming pool. She eventually promises the client to make another dress for the client under her own clothing line. Akin and Mary start to call each other often. During a call, Mary tells Akin about Gina calling her and accusing her of snatching her boyfriend. Akin replies by saying "Would you like to be?" and they both get very close from that moment. On the second day of the retreat, Mary got to know the new Chairman is Kike. She tells Mary she acquired the shares to get Akin's attention. She used to drink a lot and that ruined her home, that's the main reason Akin doesn't want to have anything to do with her again. Mary tells her that the moment Akin finds out that she's now the Chairman, he will resign, she advises her to call him instead and talk to him. Akin's mother listened to the advice and calls Akin. Akin thought it was Mary and tells her not to give the information to the Chairman anymore - He heard his mother's voice and tries to hang up, but his mother starts to apologize for everything she did and he calms down as his mother starts to eulogise him. Mary calls Alexis to tell her the dress got ruined and she informs her that she is resigning.

Akin meets Mary at a Lagos Airport. They both smile to each other and hand back their phone to each other. Akin helps Mary to carry her luggage and she gives an excited look. They both enter Akin's car as the credits roll.

Cast

Nse Ikpe Etim as Mary Oyenokwe
Wale Ojo as Akin Cole
Joke Silva as Kike Cole
Chika Okpala as Mary's Father
Tyrone Evans Clark as Tyrone
Ada Ameh as Cynthia
Lydia Forson as Gina
Chika Chukwu as Hussana
Afeez Oyetoro as Alex Ojo
Chris Iheuwa as Tony
Charles Billion as Alpha
Jay Jay Coker as Omega
Jadesola Durotoye as C.E.O
Sophia Chioma Onyekwo as Alexis
Bose Oshin as Mrs Ibekwe
Christopher John as Cynthia's husband
Toyin Onormor as Tony's wife
Jara as Seamstress 1
Biola as Seamstress 2

Production

Development
Phone swap was conceived after a brief from an advertising agency, who were taking proposals on behalf of Samsung to create a movie that would cut across ages 15 to 45. Ten scripts were submitted from different people and companies, but Afolayan's script eventually won the pitch. Although Samsung later dropped out of the project, Kunle Afolayan went ahead to solicit funds from other major sponsors as he was keen on concluding the project. Afolayan believed that although the film is not "arty" like The Figurine, it also had the potential of doing well at the box office because it is a commercial film. Afolayan however decided to steer clear of slapstick comedy, which had become a tradition for the comedy genre in Nollywood. He also stated at the press screening of the film in Lagos that the choice of a comedy genre is inline with the bid to diversify his production company; the previous two films from Golden Effects Studios had been thrillers, so Phone Swap was to show that his company was not running on a "one-way traffic". Kemi Adesoye and Afolayan came up with the story idea for the film; with the scripting stage taking a total period of two years.

Kunle Afolayan noted that Investors were slow in responding to his business plan. However, the film eventually got financial support from telecommunication companies such as Globacom and BlackBerry. Some brands were also approached to take part in the production and Some of them did product placement. Such companies include: Meelk Properties, IRS Airlines, Seven-up Bottling Company, Berrys' Couture, Honeywell Flour Mill and  Maclean. This helped subsidize the budget of the film by thirty to forty percent.

Casting
The lead male character, Akin was considered initially for Joseph Benjamin but he was later dropped when it was discovered that he had recently been paired as a couple with the signed lead actress Nse Etim for Mr. and Mrs., a film which was also in production at the time and was also released in March 2012. Jim Iyke was then called to play the role but he was unavailable at the time - shooting Last Flight to Abuja, so Wale Ojo eventually became the new lead actor. The character of Mary's father was slated for Sam loco Efe. The actor, however unfortunately died on 7 August 2011 due to an Asthma attack before filming began and Chika Okpala was later signed to replace the deceased actor. Sam Loco was honoured by dedicating the film to his memory in the Opening credit of the film.

Ada Ameh, who is from Benue and Nse Ikpe Etim from Akwa Ibom had to learn the Igbo dialect of Owerri for a period six months before the commencement of principal photography to fit into Cynthia and Mary characters respectively; who are both portrayed to be natives of Owerri. Etim in an interview with Leadership Newspaper stated: "I am not exactly a rookie when it comes to the Igbo Language but until Phone Swap, I never needed to speak Igbo as a native would. I will admit that it was quite challenging, because I had to learn a specific dialect. I am very glad for the experience, though. Igbo is a very interesting language and I enjoyed myself immensely in the process of learning it".

Director, Afolayan, had a major dispute with Globacom, regarding the casting of Hafeez Oyetoro in the film. After seeing the first edit of the film, Mike Adenuga requested for Oyetoro to be dropped from the cast line up, and his scenes reshot with another actor. This was due to the fact that Oyetoro was at the time a brand ambassador for Etisalat Nigeria, a major competitor in the Nigerian telecommunication market. Afolayan however refused, with the belief that dropping Oyetoro would "kill" the film. As a result, Globacom partially withdrew its investment from the film and Afolayan's ambassadorial contract with the company was not renewed.

Filming
Filming began in Badagry in August, before moving to Lagos; the film was shot across six weeks and the post production took three months. According to Afolayan, the most challenging part of shooting was building the interior of the airplane and the airport scene which was shot for twenty four hours without a break; the airplane cabin was recreated in the studio by Pat Nebo and his team.

Music and soundtrack

In April 2012, Golden Effects Pictures released the Original Soundtrack of Phone Swap for digital download. The Soundtrack of Phone Swap consist three original songs composed by Truth, Adekunle "Nodash" Adejuyigbe and Oyinkansola, performed by Truth and Oyinkansola and a previously released classical song by King Sunny Adé. The Music design and score was done by Truth and the use of traditional Nigerian rhythms and drums were predominantly utilized for the film background scores. The songs incorporate chants, fast-paced uplifting lyrics and traditional beats, but was downgraded to a very light piece with slower beats in some scenes. One of the songs "Fate" is an official first single from the music producer, Truth.

Track listing

Release
First official trailer of Phone Swap was released on 1 December 2011 and the second trailer was released on 22 February 2012. The film was screened in various film festivals  before it finally premiered at the EXPO hall, Eko Hotels and suites, Lagos on 17 March 2012. It was released Nationwide on 30 March 2012, had a Ghana premiere on 5 April 2012 and afterwards had its international release on 10 November 2012. It was also released in non-traditional markets like Japan, Germany, India, Brazil and Athens. Though the film had been released in the United Kingdom on 10 November 2012, it had a rerun from 16 to 24 March 2013. The film also had a rerun in Nigeria during Ramadan celebrations from 18 through 21 August 2012.

Reception

Critical reception
The film was met with mostly positive reviews. Nollywood Reinvented commended the cinematography, the subtle comedy and the romance. Though it noted that the film portrayed an unrealistic situation, it gave a 68% rating and concluded: "One great thing about the movie is the emotional connect it creates between the viewers and the ‘couple’, the viewers and the individual characters, the characters and each other and not just Mary and Akin. At the end of the movie you don't just feel like you've seen another movie. It has a lasting impact that only a few movies can create. It's one of those movies that will have you coming back to it time after time." Augusta Okon of 9aija books and movies also praised the cinematography, use of language, production design, editing and soundtrack but talked down on the obvious commercials exhibited in the film. He gave the film a rating of 4 out of 5 stars and concluded: "Phone Swap is incontrovertibly a first class comedy movie in Nollywood, sailing on the seas of dynamism and ingenuity, with its mast of professionalism beating proudly in the air and pointing to one fact…It has raised the movie bar in Nollywood once again!". Kemi Filani praised the cinematography, editing, character development, scripting and props of the film; she concluded: "Phone Swap is full of laugh out loud moments and shows how the most unlikely people  can adapt to unexpected situations and circumstances. A film I can definitely recommend." NollywoodForever gave it a Watch Definitely rating and concluded that "...It was funny, it was witty, it was heart warming and more." Dami Elebe of Connect Nigeria commended the directing and scripting of the film and stated "Without a doubt, this is the movie you are proud to show off. It is a beautifully done film and we can’t wait for another collaboration from them (the lead actors) in the future".

Andrew Rice of The New York Times commented: "Kunle Afolayan wants to scare you, he wants to thrill you, he wants to make you laugh, but most of all, he would like you to suspend your disbelief — in his plots, yes, which tend to be over the top, but also about what is possible in Africa." Shari Bollers of Afridiziak stated "All the characters were created to enable the audience to warm up to them and to laugh with and at them. With its switching of dual languages of native and English, it was easy to follow. It was a film that included everyone and warmed us with the humour. Whether Nigerian or not you will find this film funny." Caitlin Pearson of The Africa Channel stated: "What makes the plot of Phone Swap engaging are the performances from its all-star cast, and a visual range in its cinematography that allows us to see more of Nigeria than any claustrophobic Nollywood film could ever hope to do.  Francis McKay of Flick Hunter gave a 3 out of 4 stars and concluded: "Kunle Afolayan crafted a highly watchable film with a good story and a cast led by two talented actors. The film is a good representation of Nigeria...".

Kemi Filani commented on the positive portrayal of women in the film: "I love the way women were portrayed. For a change, Nigerian women were strong, smart and beautiful. Although the women in this film are flawed, like every other human being, they were also shown to be inherently good and beautiful." Dami Elebe commended the acting skills of the two lead actors in the film: "Nse Ikpe-Etim executed her role in this movie with precision, perfect pronunciation and class. Wale Ojo is not the typical Nollywood leading man. He is not the hot young boy we always want to just stare at, but the mature fine man we also want to hear. He blended in his role perfectly and showed that he is not a one movie wonder but an actor who will last a lifetime in Nollywood". Caitlin Pearson commented on Wale Ojo's acting skills by stating: "Ojo definitely impresses with his versatility as an actor in taking up this role, and manages to balance the austere qualities of Akin’s character with a sense of compassion". She also commended Hafiz Oyetoro's character  by stating "the most funny and entertaining performance is by Hafiz Oyetoro who plays Akin’s assistant Alex. Alex’s character exists in a fine balance between subservient and sneaky that is pure pleasure to watch."

Box office
Phone Swap was highly successful at the box office. The film recorded ₦3,720,000 in its domestic opening weekend. It topped the charts in its first week of release in Nigeria by grossing ₦20,713,503, beating films like Wrath of the Titans and John carter. This has been said to be due to the number of showing times given to Phone Swap with at least 6 showing times per day for a theatre. It was also reported that the film had several private screenings for corporate organizations and brands. Moreover, the film received nominations at the Africa Movie Academy Awards just before its general theatrical release.

Awards
The film received four nominations at the 8th Africa Movie Academy Awards including the category Best Nigerian Film. It eventually won the award for Achievement in Production Design. It received the most nominations at the 2012 Best of Nollywood Awards with ten nominations and won the award for Best Production Set; Nse Ikpe Etim also won the award for Best Lead Actress in an English film. Phone Swap also got most nominations and most wins at the 2013 Nollywood Movies Awards with a total of twelve nominations and won the awards for Best Movie, Best Actor in a Supporting Role for Hafeez Oyetoro, Best Actress in a Supporting Role for Ada Ameh, Best Cinematography, Best Original Screenplay and Top Box Office Movie of the Year. It was nominated for eight awards at the 2013 Golden Icons Academy Movie Awards, where Kunle Afolayan won the Best Director category.

Home media
In August 2012, it was announced that OHTV had acquired the TV rights for Phone Swap. It has since been released on VOD platforms; including OHTV, Ibaka TV, and Demand Africa. The film was released on DVD on 15 December 2014. Afolayan stated in an Interview that the delay in the DVD release was as a result of plans to have an effective distribution framework for the DVD so as to reduce copyright infringement of the film to a minimum level. The DVD is distributed by G-Media, and it features bonus content such as "behind-the-scene shots" and "The making of...". A special edition DVD package, tagged "Kunle Afolayan’s Collection", containing the other two previous films directed by Kunle Afolayan was also released.

See also
 List of Nigerian films of 2012

References

External links
 
 
 
Phone Swap on Demand Africa

2012 films
Films directed by Kunle Afolayan
English-language Nigerian films
2012 romantic comedy-drama films
Films set in Lagos
Films shot in Lagos
Films set in Abuja
Yoruba-language films
Igbo-language films
Nigerian romantic comedy-drama films
Best Production Design Africa Movie Academy Award winners
Films produced by Kunle Afolayan
2010s English-language films
2012 multilingual films
Nigerian multilingual films